A special election was held in  on November 20, 1826 to fill a vacancy caused by the death of Robert P. Henry (J) on August 25, 1826

Election results

Henry took office on December 11, 1826.  With his victory, the 12th district changed from Jacksonian control to Anti-Jacksonian control, increasing the Anti-Jacksonian membership by one.

See also
List of special elections to the United States House of Representatives

References

Kentucky 1826 12
Kentucky 1826 12
1826 12
Kentucky 12
United States House of Representatives 12
United States House of Representatives 1826 12
November 1826 events